The Cajones Formation is a Turonian geologic formation of central Bolivia. The fluvial sandstones in Amboró National Park preserve fossils of Yacarerani boliviensis. The formation is correlated with the Adamantina Formation of the Paraná Basin in Brazil and the Bajo de la Carpa Formation of the Neuquén Basin in Patagonia, Argentina.

See also 
 List of fossiliferous stratigraphic units in Bolivia
 Chaunaca Formation
 Toro Toro Formation

References

Bibliography 
 

Geologic formations of Bolivia
Upper Cretaceous Series of South America
Cretaceous Bolivia
Turonian Stage
Sandstone formations
Fluvial deposits
Paleontology in Bolivia
Geology of Santa Cruz Department (Bolivia)